Sudurağı is a belde (town) in the central district (Karaman) of Karaman Province, Turkey. The population of Sudurağı is 2,245 as of 2010. The original settlement was nothing but a base to protect the caravan route during the Ottoman Empire era. After the Turkmens settlements the Sudurağı was declared a seat of township.

Future

According to Sustainable development report prepared by the Ministry of Environment and Forestry (Turkey) the projected population of Sudurağı in 2025 is 6000. The present master plan  of the town is found to be sufficient for the future expansion.

References

Populated places in Karaman Province
Towns in Turkey
Karaman Central District